The Petroleum University of Technology is an Iranian public university funded by the Ministry of Petroleum particularly by its main company, the NIOC. It was  founded in 1939 in Abadan in response to the increasing industrialization of Iran oil company, and is officially the second oldest university in Iran after University of Tehran and based on The Center for World University Rankings (CWUR), this university has the seventh worldwide rank in oil and gas sector and petroleum engineering. According to QS World University Rankings 2020 for petroleum engineering programs, PUT has not been placed among the top 100 universities.

It has four campuses in Ahwaz, Abadan, Tehran and Mahmudabad and some research centers.

History 

The name of the university has been changed several times. The university was established in 1939 in Abadan as Abadan Technical School. The academic program comprised working and studying in sequence. The students (if employed) spent two-fifths of the academic program in the school and three-fifths in the Abadan Refinery ( Pālāyeshgāh-e Ābādān) as trainees.

In 1956, the new curriculum was prepared by Lafayette College of Pennsylvania for two years of pre engineering and four years of general engineering. The curriculum was approved by National Iranian Oil Company and 79 students out of several thousand applicants were selected based on written test and interview. The name was changed to Abadan Institute of Technology (AIT). By then, the educational program focused on the general engineering major; admissions were given to fourth grade high school students after passing an entry test and interviews. The last admissions of the program were granted in 1961 and the first students graduated in 1962.

In 1962, the new program was introduced that offered B.S. degrees in petroleum engineering, economic and administrative sciences and accounting. The programs was still internship-orientated.

After the outbreak of the War, the university was relocated. It was first moved to Gachsaran in 1981. The universities all over the country reopened in December 1982 and the university moved to the current location of Ahwaz Faculty of Petroleum in Kut-e Abdollah, Karun County.

After the War, in 1989, the Ministry of Culture and Higher Education granted permission to found the Petroleum University of Technology. All the educational institutions of the Ministry of Petroleum are supervised by the university. Ministry of Petroleum, then founded the Abadan Shahid Tondghuyan Faculty of Chemical and Petrochemical Engineering or Abadan Faculty of Petroleum in February 1992 in the location of the former Abadan Institute of Technology and The Research Center of Petroleum University of Technology in the campus of the current Ahwaz Faculty of Petroleum in 1993.

Today
As of 2015, the Petroleum University of Technology consists of four faculties in cities that offer 13 undergraduate, 11 graduate and three doctorate programs:
 Ahvaz Faculty of Petroleum (or PUT Ahvaz), 
 Abadan Faculty of Petroleum (or PUT Abadan),
 Tehran Faculty of Petroleum (N.I.O.C. school of Accounting and Finance ) (or PUT Tehran),
 Mahmudabad Faculty of Marine Sciences (or PUT Mahmudabad).

The university has four research centers:
 Ahvaz Faculty of Petroleum Research Center;
 Abadan Faculty of Petroleum Research Center;
 Tehran Faculty of Petroleum Research Center and,
 Mahmudabad Faculty of Marine Sciences Offshore Oil & Gas Industries Research Center.

PUT programs:

Roles and goals
The priorities of the PUT are maintaining the resources of oil and gas in the country and training manpower for the development and exploitation of these resources.

Students 
According to the Iranian university entrance exam (Konkoor), students ranked between 2000 and 4000 usually enter PUT. The university has sent some of its students to the  University of Calgary, Curtin University of Technology and French Institute of Petroleum (IFP).

A student has won the bronze medal of the ninth South Eastern European Mathematical Olympiad for University Students (SEEMOUS 2015) that took place in Ohrid, Republic of Macedonia, from March 3–8, 2015.

Notable alumni
Professor Abbas Firoozabadi
Dr. Hojatollah Ghanimi Fard (and Ex Vice Minister for Ministry of Petroleum and Ex Vice Minister of Ministry of Commerce)

See also
Petroleum industry in Iran

References 

Universities in Iran
Educational institutions established in 1939
Education in Khuzestan Province
1939 establishments in Iran
Abadan, Iran
Buildings and structures in Khuzestan Province
Petroleum in Iran
Energy education